Provost is a surname of French origin, deriving from a civil or military official responsible for maintaining order.  It moved to England with its conquering by William of Normandy in 1066.  It is still found in civil affairs as a provost, a mayor or other public official; the military in posts such as a provost general; and academia, in the form of a provost, the senior academic administrator.

Those with the surname include:
 Alain Provost, French landscape architect
Andrew J. Provost (1834–1925), American lawyer and politician from New York
 Claude Provost (1933–1984), Canadian ice hockey player
 David Provost (fl. 1700), Mayor of New York City (1699–1700)
 Denise Provost (born 1951), American politician from Maine
 Emily Mower Provost, American computer scientist
 Étienne Provost (1785–1850), French Canadian fur trader active in the American Southwest
 Felicia Provost, American model
 Foster Provost, American computer scientist and professor
 François Provost (1638–1702), French soldier
 George Provost (before 1943–2002), Canadian businessman and politician in Winnipeg
 Glen Provost (born 1949), American Roman Catholic Bishop
 Guy Provost (1925–2004), French Canadian actor
 Jan Provost or Jan Provoost, (c.1462–1529), Flemish painter
 Jon Provost (born 1950), American actor and author
 Lyn Provost, New Zealand public servant
 Mariève Provost (born 1985), Canadian ice hockey player
 Martin Provost, French film director, writer and actor
 Peggy Provost (born 1977), French footballer
 Ruth Provost (born 1949) American politician from Boston
 Stéphane Provost (1967–2005), French Canadian ice hockey official
 Ted Provost (born 1948), American football player
 William Provost or Guilliame Provoost, (fl.1556–1607), Protestant in Antwerp

See also
 Provost (disambiguation)
 Prevost (disambiguation)
 Provoost 
 Provoste
 Provosty

References

Occupational surnames
Surnames of French origin